Tropical Storm Danny was a weak and disorganized tropical cyclone that formed in August 2009. The fifth tropical depression and fourth named storm of the 2009 Atlantic hurricane season, Danny developed on August 26 from the interaction between a westward-moving tropical wave and an upper-level trough while situated east of the Bahamas. The storm never fully matured, and resembled a subtropical cyclone. It meandered generally northwestward before being absorbed into another weather system on August 29.

Danny had only minor effects on land. However, it triggered high surf and rip currents from Florida through the Mid-Atlantic states, leading to the death of a 12-year-old boy in North Carolina. The cyclone's remnants contributed to widespread rainfall in the northeast United States. At one point, some weather forecasts predicted Danny to rapidly strengthen, and hit Nantucket as a Category 1 hurricane, although this never occurred. Localized flooding was reported, particularly in Pennsylvania. It later caused heavy precipitation and power outages in Atlantic Canada.

Meteorological history

Danny originated in a tropical wave that exited the west coast of Africa on August 18. Convective activity associated with the system briefly began to organize on August 22, but wind shear soon halted further development. On August 24, thunderstorms once again increased as the disturbance interacted with an upper-level trough. On August 25, a Hurricane Hunters mission into the system revealed a broad area of tropical-storm force winds, but no closed circulation center. However, around 0900 UTC on August 26, satellite imagery and QuikSCAT data indicated that a closed low had formed.

Due to the interaction of the initial wave and the upper-level trough, Danny maintained a "non-classical" structure resembling that of a subtropical cyclone. Even after its designation as a tropical storm, the storm was highly disorganized. Little or no deep thunderstorm activity surrounded the center, and the highest winds were confined to a rainband in the northern semicircle of the cyclone. The storm moved erratically northwestward throughout the day on August 26, strengthening only slightly. Danny's center reformed several times, making it difficult to determine its direction of movement.

By early on August 27, the tropical storm became slightly better organized, although the most intense winds were still removed from the center. Danny peaked with maximum sustained winds of 60 mph (95 km/h) and a minimum pressure of 1006 mbar (hPa; 29.71 inHg). It held this strength for about 12 hours before reinvigorated shear caused the storm to gradually weaken as it meandered northward. By August 28, Danny further deteriorated, and reconnaissance aircraft found that it was barely a tropical storm. After stalling during the afternoon, the center resumed a north or north-northwestward drift.

A strong upper-level trough moving through the southeastern United States forced Danny northeastward. It also triggered the formation of another low pressure system near the coast of North Carolina early on August 29. Although this low formed within Danny's cyclonic envelope, satellite imagery indicated that it did not have the characteristics of a tropical cyclone. Therefore, it is not considered to be a continuation of Danny. The new low caused the tropical storm to degenerate into a trough about 275 mi (445 km) southeast of Wilmington, North Carolina, and Danny's remnants were absorbed into a developing frontal zone shortly thereafter.

Impact
In advance of the cyclone, a tropical storm watch was posted for North Carolina from Cape Lookout to the town of Duck at 2100 UTC on August 27. It was discontinued on August 29.

As the storm remained offshore, its effects were limited. However, it generated strong rip currents and high waves along the U.S. East Coast which may have resulted in the drowning death of a 12-year-old boy near Corolla, North Carolina, on August 28. Farther south,  swells reached Florida's Atlantic coast. High surf and rip currents also affected the Mid-Atlantic states, prompting officials to issue bathing restrictions. A surfer in Monmouth County, New Jersey, broke his leg in the rough conditions.

The remnants of the storm interacted with a frontal boundary, triggering widespread precipitation across numerous states. In Delaware County, Pennsylvania, torrential rainfall produced flash flooding that trapped one family in their basement. A creek near Philadelphia overflowed its banks and caused minor flooding. Several roads in Lehigh County, including one lane of U.S. Route 222, were closed due to flood waters. Flooding also took place in New Jersey; numerous basements were submerged and motorists in Camden County had to be rescued from their vehicles. The extratropical system impacted New England with high winds and heavy rainfall. At least  of rain fell in Massachusetts and Rhode Island. Some roads throughout the region became impassable due to standing water.

Danny's remnants later caused heavy rain across Atlantic Canada. At Saint John, New Brunswick,  of rain flooded at least 50 basements. The Meteorological Service of Canada hoisted several weather advisories for New Brunswick, Newfoundland, Prince Edward Island and Nova Scotia. In Nova Scotia, over 16,000 residences lost power at the height of the storm.

See also

Timeline of the 2009 Atlantic hurricane season
List of North Carolina hurricanes (2000–present)
List of New England hurricanes
List of Canada hurricanes
Other storms of the same name

References

External links

Advisory archive for Tropical Storm Danny
List of bulletins from the Canadian Hurricane Centre

2009 Atlantic hurricane season
Atlantic tropical storms
Hurricanes in Canada
Hurricanes in North Carolina
Danny